Sirma Glacier is the  long and  wide glacier on the west side of Owen Ridge in southern Sentinel Range, Ellsworth Mountains in Antarctica, situated south of Bolgrad Glacier, and flowing west-southwestwards from Mount Southwick, Mount Milton and Mount Inderbitzen to leave the range and join Nimitz Glacier northwest of Modren Peak.

The glacier is named after the Bulgarian woman rebel leader Sirma Voyvoda (1773-1858).

Location
US mapping in 1961, updated in 1988.

See also
 List of glaciers in the Antarctic
 Glaciology

Maps
 Vinson Massif.  Scale 1:250 000 topographic map.  Reston, Virginia: US Geological Survey, 1988.
 Antarctic Digital Database (ADD). Scale 1:250000 topographic map of Antarctica. Scientific Committee on Antarctic Research (SCAR). Since 1993, regularly updated.

References
 Bulgarian Antarctic Gazetteer. Antarctic Place-names Commission. (details in Bulgarian, basic data in English)
 Sirma Glacier. SCAR Composite Gazetteer of Antarctica

External links
 Sirma Glacier. Copernix satellite image

Glaciers of Ellsworth Land
Bulgaria and the Antarctic